The Hennell family is a family of prominent silver-smiths and writers in Southern England. The family is possibly of Huguenot origin, and has traditionally held dissenting religious and Liberal political convictions. All members can be traced back to David Hennell (1712-1785), who founded the silver-smith dynasty, and include:

 Henry Hennell FRS (c.1797–1842), chemist
 Hennell (1817 cricketer) (fl. 1817), English first-class cricketer for Marylebone Cricket Club
 Colonel Samuel Hennell (1800-1880), Indian Army officer and Colonial Office administrator
 Mary Hennell (1802–1843), writer
 Charles Christian Hennell (1809–1850), merchant and Unitarian apologist
 Sara Hennell (1812–1899), writer
 Caroline Hennell, known as Cara Bray, (1814–1905), writer and wife of Charles Bray
 Thomas Hennell (1903–1945), artist and writer
 Professor Michael Hennell (born 1940), leading computer scientist